Thornley-with-Wheatley is a civil parish in the Borough of Ribble Valley, Lancashire, England. It is entirely rural, with no villages or other substantial settlements. Its population was 320 in 2011, a figure that has not changed much for over a century.

The parish includes most of the western half of Longridge Fell, including the part known as Jeffrey Hill, and, apart from half a mile (1 km) at its western end, lies within the Forest of Bowland Area of Outstanding Natural Beauty. The River Loud forms its northwestern border. It includes Longridge Golf Club and the isolated Catholic chapel of St William at Lee House, a Grade II listed building, whose parish closed in 1991 but is still occasionally used.

Ann Cutler, the weaver and Methodist evangelist, was born here in 1759.

See also

Listed buildings in Thornley-with-Wheatley

References

External links

Civil parishes in Lancashire
Geography of Ribble Valley
Forest of Bowland